Pulikkanny is a small village near Varantharappilli in Thrissur district of Kerala state, south India.

Location
Thrissur is 25 km from Pulikkanny. Chimmony dam is 12 km from here.

Forest Research Institute
Field Research Station of Kerala Forest Research Institute (KFRI) is stationed in Pulikkanny. Here the main research is about different types of bamboos.

Churches
St. Josephs Church Velupadam is famous for "Ootuthirunal" festival which is conducted on 15 August each year. This church is only 1.5 km from Pulikkanny. Kurumali River flows through this village.

Gallery

References

Villages in Thrissur district